Buchina (in Urdu بچیانہ ) is a small city in Jaranwala Tehsil established as Buchina mandi (Grain Market). Buchiana is located in area of Chak 656/7 GB. it has railway station name Buchiana railway station on Shorkot–Sheikhupura Branch Line  it is located on Jaranwala-Nankana Road Buchiana is 20 km from Jaranwala 
From Buchiana there is  operational  narrow gauge horse-drawn tramway originally built in 1898 to connect with the Buchiana railway station  to the south Ghangha Pur .

References

Heritage streetcar systems
Horse-drawn railways
Horse-drawn trams in operation
Villages in Faisalabad District